The flag of the Ivano-Frankivsk Region (translit.: Prapor Ivano-Frankivs'koi oblasti) is one of regional flags of Ukraine. It is a symbol of the Ivano-Frankivsk Oblast that inherits a historical tradition of using regional symbols and is an attribute of the local government and executive powers.

The flag represents a banner of 2:3 proportion. In the middle of a white field is depicted a black jackdaw with raised wings and golden (yellow) crown, while facing the flagpole. At the flagpole side and along the side stretch red and black stripes, while on the opposite side the same way stretch blue and yellow stripes. The width of each stripe consists of 1/12 of the flag's length. The stripes represent the tradition of a fight for independence. The red and black stripes are the traditional colors of Red Ruthenia, while the blue and yellow are the colors of the bigger Ukraine.

See also
 List of flags of Ukraine

References

External links

Flags of Ukraine
Ivano-Frankivsk Oblast
Flags displaying animals
Flags introduced in 2001